The Irish National Opera was created from a merger of the Opera Theatre Company (OTC) and Wide Open Opera in 2017 and launched in January 2018. The new entity continues the tradition of the former Opera Ireland, Ireland's first permanent national opera company. Although its roots go back to 1941 as the Dublin Grand Opera Society, the company was established in its final form in 1985 as the Dublin Grand Opera Society Ltd. From 1996 until its demise in 2010 it was known as Opera Ireland. During its existence it was based at Dublin's Gaiety Theatre.

History

Beginnings
The Dublin Grand Opera Society (DGOS) was founded in 1941 by Captain (later Colonel) William O'Kelly and a group of opera enthusiasts with John McCormack as its patron. The shows were cast with local singers and a volunteer chorus. Initially the music was provided by the orchestra of the Irish Army music school, and later by the Radio Eireann Symphony Orchestra. The Society put on two one-week seasons of opera throughout the years of World War II. After the war ended the DGOS presented performances by European opera companies such as the Opera-Comique, Hamburg Opera and the Netherlands Opera. From the mid-1950s to 1966, the Society, concentrated on Italian opera with the help of sponsorship from the Italian government. During that time numerous Italian stars and rising stars of the day appeared there, including Luciano Pavarotti who sang in Rigoletto, La traviata, and La bohème. The Italian sponsorship ended in 1966, but the Arts Council of Ireland and the Bord Fáilte (Ireland's tourist board) continued to provide guarantees for any financial losses. New opera companies were brought in, including the Romanian National Opera and the Prague National Theatre.

Development and demise
In the mid-1980s, after a particularly shambolic production of Tosca, the DGOS came under pressure from the Arts Council to move towards mounting its own productions and spending more on sets and costumes. The Society was reconstituted as a private company limited by guarantee in 1985 and began the transition from an amateur society to a fully-fledged professional company, taking on its first permanent staff—an Administrator, artistic director and Chorus Master.  The volunteer amateur chorus was given a professional "core" through a contract with the National Chamber Choir of Ireland. The British theatre and opera director Michael McCaffery was appointed the company's first artistic director in 1986 and the company continued presenting two one-week seasons each year with two productions each season.

According to Michael Dervan, the music critic of The Irish Times, under Michael McCaffery, there were immediate and major improvements in production values. However, McCaffery resigned in 1989 without completing his full contract. His successor, Kenneth Richardson, lasted for only two seasons. Richardson was followed by Elaine Padmore who at the time was also the artistic director of the Wexford Festival. When she departed in 1993 to become artistic director of the Royal Danish Opera, Dorothea Glatt took over. Glatt combined her post at DGOS with her ongoing work as the assistant to Wolfgang Wagner at the Bayreuth Festival. Her tenure was not a particularly successful one and in 1996 the company advertised once again for a new artistic director. That same year it also officially re-branded itself as Opera Ireland.

Opera Ireland ceased operation in 2010. The Arts Council of Ireland had planned to create the Irish National Opera.

Irish National Opera
The project was restarted in 2017 with the formation of a new Irish National Opera to be formed under from the merger of Opera Theatre Company and Wide Open Opera with Fergus Sheil as artistic director. The Irish National Opera officially launched in January 2018 with a production of Thomas Adès's chamber opera Powder Her Face.

References

External links

Official website as archived on 10 May 2010
Video: History Of Opera Ireland 1941–2010 (archived)
Brochure for the 1963 Spring Festival of Italian Opera presented by the Dublin Grand Opera Society

Opera companies
Arts in Dublin (city)
Musical groups established in 1985
Musical groups disestablished in 2010
Music organisations based in the Republic of Ireland
1985 establishments in Ireland
2017 establishments in Ireland